General elections were held in Panama on 7 June 1936, electing both a new President of the Republic and a new National Assembly.

According to Thomas L. Pearcy, "Instead of supporting the candidate of his own Liberal Doctrinaire Party (Domingo Díaz Arosemena), the President Harmodio Arias Madrid supported Juan Demóstenes Arosemena Barreati, his minister of foreign relations. Arosemena continued to function as part of the administration throughout his campaign. With President Harmodio Arias as his political patron, Arosemena stuck to his controversial (and unconstitutional) candidacy. On election day, the administration distributed duplicate ‘cédulas’ (voter registration cards), destroyed ballot boxes, detained opposing members of the electoral board, and concocted ‘el paquetazo de Veraguas’. The result was a high voter turnout that exceeded all predictions – and possibilities – and brought Arosemena to the presidency despite his constitutional ineligibility."

Results

President

National Assembly

Aftermath
President Arosemena died on 16 December 1939 and was briefly succeeded by Ezequiel Fernández Jaén who was his second Vice-President while the first one, Augusto Samuel Boyd, left Washington where he was acting as Panamanian ambassador, came to Panamá.

References

Panama
1936 in Panama
Elections in Panama
Presidential elections in Panama
Election and referendum articles with incomplete results